Harichandanpur is a medium size town located in Harichandanpur Block of Kendujhar district, Odisha, with total 442 families residing. The Harichandanpur town has population of 1990 of which 1106 are males while 884 are females as per Population Census 2011.

References

Kendujhar district